Adad Banda is a town in the Federally Administered Tribal Areas of Pakistan. It is located at 34°54'42N 71°34'18E with an altitude of 1468 metres (4819 feet).

References

Populated places in Khyber Pakhtunkhwa